Glyphostoma rostrata is a species of sea snail, a marine gastropod mollusk in the family Clathurellidae.

Description

Distribution
This species occurs in the Pacific Ocean along the Philippines and New Caledonia.

References

External links
 
 MNHN, Paris: Glyphostoma rostrata (holotype)

rostrata
Gastropods described in 2001